The 2020 Missouri lieutenant gubernatorial election was a general election occurring on November 3, 2020, in which the incumbent Republican, Mike Kehoe, defeated his challenger, Democrat Alissia Canady.  Kehoe was originally appointed to the position in 2018, making the election his first time elected as Missouri's Lieutenant Governor, despite the fact he was already in office at the time of the election.

Democratic primary

Candidates

Declared
Alissia Canady, former Kansas City councilwoman and former Jackson County assistant prosecutor
Gregory Upchurch, small businessowner

Results

Republican primary

Candidates

Declared
Mike Carter, St. Charles County municipal judge
Arnie Dienoff, legal consultant
Mike Kehoe, incumbent Lieutenant Governor of Missouri
Aaron Wisdom

Results

Third parties

Libertarian Party

Candidates

Declared
 Bill Slantz, businessman

Results

Green Party

Candidates

Declared
 Kelley Dragoo

Results

General election

Polling

Results

See also
 2020 Missouri gubernatorial election

Notes

References

Lieutenant Governor
2020
Missouri